Jeremy J. Whitlock (born  September 15, 1965) is a Section Head in the Dept. of Safeguards at the International Atomic Energy Agency in Vienna.  He has a Ph.D. in Engineering Physics from McMaster University and formerly worked at Canadian Nuclear Laboratories.

He was past president and director of the Canadian Nuclear Society (CNS) and a past board member of the American Nuclear Society.

References

External links
The Canadian Nuclear FAQ 
Canadian Nuclear Society profile (PDF)

1965 births
Living people
Canadian physicists
McMaster University alumni